The following lists events in the year 2023 in Nicaragua.

Incumbents 

 President: Daniel Ortega
 Vice President: Rosario Murillo

Events 

 9 February – The government of Nicaragua releases 222 political prisoners and sends them to the United States.

See also 

List of years in Nicaragua
2023 Atlantic hurricane season
COVID-19 pandemic in North America
Public holidays in Nicaragua

References 

 
2020s in Nicaragua
Years of the 21st century in Nicaragua
Nicaragua
Nicaragua